"Day & Night" is a song by English singer turned actress Billie Piper. The song was written by Piper, Eliot Kennedy, Mark Cawley, Mike Percy and Tim Lever for Piper's second album Walk of Life (2000). It was released as the album's lead single on 15 May 2000 to positive reviews from music critics. It was a commercial success, reaching number one in the United Kingdom and was certified silver.

According to Piper's autobiography and various sources, the single sold over a quarter of a million copies in the United Kingdom alone.

Critical reception
The song received positive reviews from music critics. Yahoo! reviewer Jackie Flynn wrote that the song was a "slick piece of dominatrix dance" with "big buffed chords and spike-heel beats". Peter Robinson of NME described "Day & Night" as "exciting" and the magazine wrote that the song was "somewhat harder and American sounding" than her previous singles.

Chart performance
"Day & Night" debuted on the UK Singles Chart on 21 May 2000 at number one. It remained on the chart for twelve weeks, before exiting the top seventy-three on 19 August 2000. In May 2000, the single was certified silver. This was Piper's third chart-topper in the UK—jointly the most achieved by a British female artist at this point. This record was beaten a year later by Geri Halliwell. The track also reached the top 20 in Ireland and the top 50 in Flanders and the Netherlands.

In Australia, "Day & Night" debuted on the ARIA Singles Chart on 4 June 2000 at number 16. Eight weeks later, the song peaked at number eight. The track debuted in New Zealand on 4 June 2000 at number 43. It peaked at number six three weeks later and remained on the chart for 15 weeks.

Music video

The music video for "Day & Night" was directed by Cameron Casey. It features Piper dancing at a nightclub with a group of friends. The video begins with Piper and three friends walking down a street at night, looking for an exclusive nightclub. After being allowed in, Piper and a group of male dancers begin to perform a dance routine. She is then shown dancing with a group of female dancers on a brightly lit street. The third scene features Piper dancing in a pink room. The video concludes with Piper and her dancers in a laundrette, dancing on top of washing machines and throwing washing powder around the room. The video premiered in the UK on 9 March 2000.

Track listings

UK CD1 and Australian CD single 
 "Day & Night" (Stargate mix) – 3:15
 "Day & Night" (Almighty Club mix) – 8:04
 "Day & Night" (Robbie Rivera's Bombastic vocal mix) – 7:05
 "Day & Night" (video)

UK CD2 
 "Day & Night" (Stargate mix) – 3:15
 "Tinted Eyes" – 3:57
 "Day & Night" (Friday Hope mix) – 7:13

UK cassette single 
A1. "Day & Night" (Stargate mix) – 3:15
A2. "Honey to the Bee" (Hex Hector mix) – 4:32
B1. "Day & Night" (Sleaze Sisters anthem) – 6:40

Credits and personnel
Credits are lifted from the UK CD1 liner notes.

Studio
 Recorded and mixed at StarGate Studios (Norway)

Personnel

 Billie Piper – writing, vocals
 Eliot Kennedy – writing, production
 Mark Cawley – writing
 Tim Lever – writing, production
 Mike Percy – writing, production
 StarGate – additional production

 Joe Pearson – artwork design
 Enrique Badulescu – photography
 Brilliant – management
 Nick Godwyn – management
 Nicki Chapman – management

Charts and certifications

Weekly charts

Year-end charts

Certifications

References

2000 singles
2000 songs
Billie Piper songs
Innocent Records singles
Number-one singles in Scotland
Song recordings produced by Stargate (record producers)
Songs written by Eliot Kennedy
Songs written by Mike Percy (musician)
Songs written by Tim Lever
UK Singles Chart number-one singles
Virgin Records singles